Dhab Pari is a village located in Har Char Dhab union council of Chakwal District in the Punjab Province of Pakistan.

Dhab Pari is located 8 km from Chakwal city and now encompasses Dhoke Sarang Khan, a hamlet with a strong historical background. The hamlet was founded by Chaudhry Sarang Khan in 18th or 19th century.

In 1936, Chaudhry Noor Khan Gandhi (nicknamed after Gandhi), another notable from the area established first ever girls school of Jhelum District in Dhab Pari since Chakwal District used to be part of Jhelum district at that time.

Notable people

Chaudhry Sarang Khan
Chaudhry Noor Khan Gandhi

References

Villages in Chakwal District
Populated places in Chakwal District